The Internazionali di Tennis Città di Vicenza is a tennis tournament held in Vicenza, Italy since 2014. The event is part of the ATP Challenger Tour and is played on outdoor clay courts.

Past finals

Singles

Doubles

References

External links
 Official website

 
ATP Challenger Tour
Tennis tournaments in Italy
Clay court tennis tournaments
Recurring sporting events established in 2014